Oligia is a genus of moths of the family Noctuidae described by Jacob Hübner in 1821.

Species

 Oligia agelasta (D. S. Fletcher, 1961)
 Oligia albilinea Laporte, 1973
 Oligia albirivula Hampson, 1908
 Oligia ambigua (Walker, 1858)
 Oligia ambiguella (D. S. Fletcher, 1961)
 Oligia atrivitta Hampson, 1914
 Oligia bridghami (Grote & Robinson, 1866)
 Oligia brunneonigra Laporte, 1973
 Oligia chlorostigma (Harvey, 1876)
 Oligia confusa Janse, 1937
 Oligia cupricolor Laporte, 1973
 Oligia decinerea (D. S. Fletcher, 1961)
 Oligia dinawa (Bethune-Baker, 1906)
 Oligia divesta (Grote, 1874)
 Oligia dubia (Heydemann, 1942)
 Oligia egens (Walker, 1857)
 Oligia fasciuncula (Haworth, 1809) – middle-barred minor
 Oligia flava Laporte, 1973
 Oligia h-notata Berio, 1976
 Oligia hypothermes Hampson, 1908
 Oligia hypoxantha Hampson, 1914
 Oligia infima Laporte, 1973
 Oligia instructa (Walker, 1865)
 Oligia intermedia Berio, 1976
 Oligia latra Berio, 1976
 Oligia latruncula (Denis & Schiffermüller, 1775) – tawny marbled minor
 Oligia leleupi Berio, 1976
 Oligia leuconephra Hampson, 1908
 Oligia longidens Berio, 1976
 Oligia mediofasciata Draudt, 1950
 Oligia melandonta Hampson, 1908
 Oligia minuscula (Morrison, 1874)
 Oligia modica (Guenée, 1852)
 Oligia multiplicata Berio, 1976
 Oligia nigrithorax Draudt, 1950
 Oligia niveiplagoides Poole, 1989
 Oligia nyctichroa E. D. Jones, 1908
 Oligia obsolescens Berio, 1977
 Oligia obtusa (Smith, 1902)
 Oligia pachydetis (D. S. Fletcher, 1961)
 Oligia perpusilla Berio, 1976
 Oligia rampartensis Barnes & Benjamin, 1923
 Oligia rufata Kardakoff, 1928
 Oligia rufilinea Laporte, 1983
 Oligia rufolonigra Laporte, 1973
 Oligia rufulus Laporte, 1973
 Oligia rufulusoides Laporte, 1973
 Oligia scriptonigra Laporte, 1973
 Oligia scriptonova Berio, 1976
 Oligia semicana (Walker, 1865)
 Oligia semidiaphana Berio, 1976
 Oligia sodalis Draudt, 1950
 Oligia stenopterygioides Berio, 1976
 Oligia strigilis (Linnaeus, 1758) – marbled minor
 Oligia subambigua (D. S. Fletcher, 1961)
 Oligia suleiman Rezbayai-Reser, 1997
 Oligia tripunctata (D. S. Fletcher, 1961)
 Oligia turcia Rezbanyai-Reser, 1997
 Oligia tusa (Grote, 1878)
 Oligia vandarban Rezbanyai-Reser, 1997
 Oligia versicolor (Borkhausen, 1792) – rufous minor
 Oligia violacea (Grote, 1881)

Former species
Oligia arbora is now known as Mesapamea arbora (Barnes & McDunnough, 1912)
Oligia fractilinea is now known as Mesapamea fractilinea (Grote, 1874)
Oligia hausta (Grote, 1882) is now a synonym of Neoligia semicana (Walker, 1865)
Oligia illocata is now known as Fishia illocata (Walker, 1857)
Oligia indirecta is now known as Xylomoia indirecta (Grote, 1875)
Oligia laevigata (Smith, 1898) is now a synonym of Neoligia subjuncta (Smith, 1898)
Oligia mactata is now known as Platypolia mactata (Guenée, 1852)
Oligia marina is now Aseptis marina (Grote, 1874)

References
 
 

 
Apameini